Windsor Football Club was an English association football club based in Berkshire.  The club was founded in September 1882 as a merger between the Windsor Home Park and Grosvenor clubs.

History

The club entered the FA Cup three times in the 1880s, its best run coming in its first entry, in 1882-83, reaching the third round.  Although the club had been drawn at home to the Clapham Rovers, the tie was played at the St Mark's College ground, probably because Home Park was waterlogged.

The club's final entry in 1884-85 ended in withdrawal, after being drawn away at Chatham, although the club was more successful at local level.  Windsor won the Berks & Bucks Senior Cup twice; in 1884 beating South Reading 6-2 after an initial drawn match, and beating the same opponents 2–0 in 1887.

In 1888 Prince Albert of Schleswig-Holstein was elected as a club member.  However, by 1890 the club seems to have been in abeyance, other than as a social concern; playing loyalties had switched to Windsor Phoenix, who would eventually become Windsor & Eton.

Colours

The club listed its colours as chocolate and light blue, probably in halves as that was a popular design for the colours.

Honours

FA Cup

Best performance: 1882-83: 3rd Round (last 25)

Berks & Bucks Senior Cup

Winners: 1883–84, 1886–87
Runners-up: 1884-85

References

Association football clubs established in 1882
Defunct football clubs in England
Defunct football clubs in Berkshire